Concord is an area of Washington, a town in Tyne and Wear, England. Historically, Concord was part of County Durham, joining the county of Tyne and Wear in 1974, following its creation.

Washington is centrally located, with the city centres of Newcastle upon Tyne, Durham and Sunderland, hence, it has close ties to all three cities. All three cities are easily accessible by road, and public transport from Concord.

The main street at Concord's centre is Front Street, which comprises several local shops, bars and cafés.

Concord houses the Washington Millennium Centre, situated in The Oval, which provides youth clubs for children and young people, as well as having an outdoor football area and other regular activities.

The village also has a small health centre, the Victoria Health Centre, situated on Victoria Road, near to the bus station.

Neighbouring villages include Albany, Donwell, Usworth, Sulgrave and Follingsby. Nearby industrial estates include Stephenson and Hertburn, as well as the Nissan UK Factory.

Washington School is also nearby, just north of the Sunderland Highway.

Transport 

Concord Bus Station is served by Go North East's local bus services, with frequent routes running in and around Washington, as well as County Durham, Gateshead, Newcastle upon Tyne and Sunderland. The bus station has six departure stands (lettered A–F), each of which is fitted with seating, next bus information displays, and timetable posters.

As of June 2020, the stand allocation is:

Populated places in Tyne and Wear
Washington, Tyne and Wear